The Carroll Building (also formerly the site of the Apopka Historical Society Museum) is a historic building in Apopka, Florida. It is located at 407-409 South Park Avenue. On March 4, 1993, it was added to the U.S. National Register of Historic Places. It currently serves as the site of Aunt Gingibread's Bakery.

The Apopka Historical Society now operates the Museum of the Apopkans at 122 East Fifth Street, Apopka, Florida.

References

External links
 Orange County listings at National Register of Historic Places
 National Park Service | National Register of Historic Places Registration Form
 Florida's Office of Cultural and Historical Programs
 Orange County listings
 Carroll Building

Gallery

Buildings and structures completed in 1932
National Register of Historic Places in Orange County, Florida
Apopka, Florida
1932 establishments in Florida